Hundleby is a village and civil parish in the  East Lindsey district of Lincolnshire, England. The village is a suburb of the market town of Spilsby.

Hundleby is listed in the 1086 Domesday Book as "Hundelbi", with Ivo Tallboys (Ivo Tallebois) as Lord of the Manor. This was long an agricultural area, a centre for sugar beet production.

The Anglican church, which is a Grade II listed building, is dedicated to Saint Mary. The 14th-century medieval church was mostly torn down in 1854-55 and reconstructed using the original greenstone. Only the base of the tower and nave remain of the former church.

Spilsby Union Workhouse was built in Hundleby in 1837, to designs by George Gilbert Scott.  After 1930 it became a Public Assistance Institution. In 1948 it was converted to the Gables Hospital providing geriatric care. It was eventually closed and demolished.

An electoral ward of the same name stretches north to Swaby, containing 2,107 people as of the 2011 Census.

References

External links

Villages in Lincolnshire
East Lindsey District
Civil parishes in Lincolnshire